The bigeye jumprock (Moxostoma ariommum) is a species of ray-finned fish in the family Catostomidae.
It is found only in the upper Roanoke River drainage in Virginia and North Carolina, United States. It inhabits deep rocky runs and pools with large boulders and rubble. It reaches a maximum length of around 22 cm.

Sources

Moxostoma
Fish described in 1956
Taxonomy articles created by Polbot